The Mutopia Project is a volunteer-run effort to create a library of free content sheet music, in a way similar to Project Gutenberg's library of public domain books.  It started in 2000.

The music is reproduced from old scores that are in the public domain. New scores are digitally typeset with GNU LilyPond and distributed in the following formats:
 PDF format in both letter and A4 paper sizes for printing,
 MIDI for aural reproduction, and 
 LilyPond source code format.

Currently, there are more than 2,000 pieces of music available, more than half of which are pieces for piano. There are also many pieces for voice, and various other musical instruments. The Mutopia Project home page has a list of links to the most recently added pieces.

See also 
 List of online music databases
 Public domain resources
 Open music
 International Music Score Library Project, a similar music cataloging project, that collects both typeset and scanned scores.
Werner Icking Music Archive
Choral Public Domain Library

References

External links 

Mutopia Project home page
Mutopia Project mirror (Portugal)
Project maintenance site
Creative Commons Content Directory listing
Wiki-score, an online, collaborative platform for large-scale sheet music editing

Collaborative projects
Online music and lyrics databases
Libre culture
Internet properties established in 2000
Canadian music websites